Foundation College of Technology is a privately owned polytechnic located at Ikot Idem Offikono Road, Ikot Ekpene Akwa Ibom State, in southeastern Nigeria.

Background 
The institution was founded in 2013. It was granted the accreditation of all its programmes in 2014 by the National Board for Technical Education (NBTE) with the Joint Admissions Matriculation Board (JAMB) listing it as one of the institutions for prospective candidates to choose for admission. The programmes of the institution are targeted towards producing graduates that can serve in the lower and middle cadre of hi-tech workplaces or lead in start-ups in the field of technology.

Courses 
The institution offers various courses under the following departments;

 Computer Software Engineering Technology
 Electrical/Electronic Engineering Technology
 Management Technology
 Networking and System Security
 Petroleum Engineering Technology

See also 
 List of Polytechnics in Nigeria

References

External links 
 http://foundationpoly.com.ng/

Education in Akwa Ibom State
Polytechnics in Nigeria